BS22 may refer to:
BS22, a BS postcode area for Bristol, England
Bonomi BS.22 Alzavola, a motor glider
BS-22 María Zambrano, a Spanish Maritime Safety and Rescue Society tugboat	
BS 22 Report on Effect of Temperature on Insulating Materials, a British Standard